The Chattanooga Whiskey Company is a producer of bourbon whiskey and "Tennessee High Malt" bourbon whiskey, located in Chattanooga, Tennessee. The company was founded by Tim Piersant and Joe Ledbetter. The 1816 brand was launched in April 2012, and the company simultaneously announced its intention to help change local distilling laws. The launch met with some initial criticism, primarily due to where the product was made (contract manufactured at MGP/LDI of Indiana), but Hamilton County laws prohibited the manufacture of "intoxicating liquors" at the time. Local public awareness eventually became a catalyst in galvanizing support to change Prohibition-era distilling laws. In March 2015, the company opened the first legal distillery in Chattanooga since Prohibition. The first experimental whiskey, "Batch 001: Tennessee High Malt", was released in August 2017.

The company’s production facility and headquarters is located on Chattanooga’s riverfront and engages in larger scale production of select recipes created at the experimental facility. The facility began production in 2017 and has made Chattanooga Whiskey one of the largest craft whiskey producers in the state of Tennessee.

History

2011 
In November 2011, the launch of Chattanooga Whiskey Company was announced along with a plan to release a first whiskey by early 2012. Because it was illegal at the time to distill spirits in Chattanooga, the company revealed it would sell whiskey distilled in Lawrenceburg, Indiana and bottled in Nashville, Tennessee. Co-founders Tim Piersant and Joe Ledbetter expressed interest in the process for changing the county's distilling laws.

2012 
In April 2012, the company announced the release of two locally-inspired whiskeys: 1816 Reserve and 1816 Cask. The 1816 in the name comes from the year a trading post was set up by the river in the area that eventually became Chattanooga. Both have the same mash bill of 75% corn, 21% rye, and 4% malted barley, but the Reserve is 90 proof compared to 113.6 proof for the Cask.

On November 15, 2012, Piersant and Ledbetter presented a pro-economic case to a crowded Hamilton County commission chamber to show the benefits of local spirit production. The local community and local commissioners were largely supportive, and shortly after the courthouse session – on November 21, 2012 – the Hamilton County Commission voted to adopt a non-binding resolution for the Tennessee General Assembly.

2013 
In 2013, the founders launched the "Vote Whiskey" campaign to promote the legalization of distilling in Hamilton County. In March, the company announced plans to build a distillery on Fort and 14th Streets, on the south side of Chattanooga, pending the passing of House Bill 102 to allow legal distilling in the county. The 30,000-square-foot property was the original site of the Turnbull Cone Machine Company in 1910 and is on the National Register of Historic Places. The estimated cost for the project was $2 million.

In May 2013, House Bill 102 – nicknamed the "whiskey bill" and sponsored by Joe Carr, R-Lascassas and Bill Ketron, R-Murfreesboro – was signed by Governor Bill Haslam, allowing Chattanooga Whiskey to begin the process of building the first legal distillery in Hamilton County in a century. The plan to build at the previously announced location fell through, and in October 2013, the company announced plans for a different distillery location on the corner of 4th and Broad Streets in downtown Chattanooga. The 60,000-square-foot property known as the John Ross Building was estimated to be a $6 million investment. Construction delays were announced in March 2014, and the location was abandoned in September 2014 due to structural and logistical issues.

2014 
In April 2014, the parent company of Chattanooga Whiskey – Tennessee Stillhouse – launched Freedom Moonshine. This brand is no longer produced.

In July, co-founder Joe Ledbetter announced he was resigning from the company, citing personal and professional reasons.

In September, after deciding not to renovate the John Ross Building for the distillery, the company announced a plan to open a 100-gallon micro-distillery across from the historic Chattanooga Choo Choo. The site included research and development operations for the brand and served as a tour and tasting location for the public.

In December, the company announced the hiring of Grant McCracken as its head distiller. McCracken had previously worked as Head Brewer of R&D at Samuel Adams in Boston, Massachusetts, and he came on board in the midst of the micro-distillery build out.

2015 
Work on the 2,500-square-foot micro-distillery began at the end of 2014 and concluded in March 2015. The grand opening for the location – originally called Tennessee Stillhouse Micro Distillery – took place on March 24, 2015, with the initiation of both tours and distilling operations. The distillery was named one of Southern Living's "50 Best Places in the South" in its first year. In March 2017, this location was renamed Chattanooga Whiskey Experimental Distillery.

In August 2015, Tennessee Stillhouse launched Dr. Thacher's Cocktail Syrups, a joint venture between Tennessee Stillhouse and Pure Sodaworks to produce a series of non-alcoholic, pre-mixed syrups for making common whiskey cocktails.

In November, the company released its first whiskey called Chattanooga Whiskey 100, a white Tennessee malted bourbon. The 100 in the name refers to the century that passed before it became legal again to distill whiskey in Chattanooga. Additionally, the whiskey is 100 proof, and only 100 cases were produced. The company had more than 50 experimental whiskeys aging by the end of 2015.

2016 
In April 2016, Chattanooga Whiskey won a series of awards for its 1816 line of straight bourbon whiskeys. At the 2016 San Francisco World Spirit Awards, the 1816 Reserve won Double Gold for small batch bourbon, and the 1816 Cask won Gold in the same category.  At the American Distilling Institute Spirit Competition, the 1816 Cask won Gold for straight bourbon. At the International Whisky Competition, the 1816 Cask won Gold for "Best Bourbon Whiskey", and the 1816 Reserve won Gold for "Best Small Batch Bourbon".

In July, the company announced plans to open a larger, 46,000-square-foot production facility on the corner of Riverfront Parkway and Martin Luther King Boulevard in the historic former Newton Chevrolet car dealership. Construction activities on this property began in late July 2016 and were completed in March 2017.

2017 
In March 2017, the new facility opened on Riverfront Parkway with 15,000 square feet of barrel storage space (enough for 4,000 53-gallon white oak barrels), 3,000 square feet of office space, and 5,000 square feet of event space for approximately 300 guests. The company held a launch party for the public at the facility in December, but there are no plans to offer tours or public access at this location at this time. Tours are conducted at the original micro-distillery location on the south side.

In August 2017, the company announced the release of its first aged Chattanooga whiskey as part of the Experimental Single Batch Series. Batch 001 was a "Tennessee High Malt", and 228 cases were produced. This style has now become a focus for the brand, as many of its experimental whiskeys have used "high malt" phrasing.

In October, the 1816 line was extended to include the Native Series, the result of a collaborative partnership between Chattanooga Whiskey and six local breweries – Terminal Brewhouse, Hutton & Smith Brewing Company, Moccasin Bend Brewing Company, OddStory Brewing Company, Big River Brewing Works, and Chattanooga Brewing Company – and one Nashville brewery, Yazoo Brewing Company. The Native Series whiskeys are finished in casks previously used to age different style beers from each brewery. The distillery plans to produce new batches of the Native Series every year.

In November, the company released Batch 002 and Batch 003 in the Experimental Series. Batch 002 is a smoked high malt, while Batch 003 is a native barrel whiskey because of its aging in smoked beer barrels previously used to age the Native Series.

For 2017, Chattanooga Whiskey production demand was about 10,000 cases for products that are available in Tennessee, South Carolina, and Georgia. Actual production before opening the new riverfront location was only about 2,500 cases a year out of the microdistillery, leading the distillery to source bourbon from an Indiana distillery to meet the 10,000-case volume in the past. The new location will increase distillery production to 14 barrels per day versus one barrel per week at the micro-distillery location.

2018 
In February 2018, the company released three additional experimental whiskeys: Batch 004, Batch 005, and Batch 006. Batch 004 is Scottish-style high malt, Batch 005 is a wheated high malt, and Batch 006 is a beer-barrel-finished wheated high malt that shared barrels with Hutton & Smith's Wee Heavy Ale. All three whiskeys were bottled at 102 proof.

The next experimental release – available on a very limited basis with only about 60 cases of each whiskey produced – took place in May. Batch 007 is a Tennessee rye malt, and Batch 008 is a Tennessee single malt.

At the 2018 San Francisco World Spirits Competition, the company won five medals for its whiskeys and two for its packaging.

2022 

In January 2022, Chattanooga Whiskey released their second release of the Islay Scotch Cask Finish crafted at their Chattanooga Whiskey Riverfront Distillery. 

This iteration of their whiskey was aged for over 4 years, including 3 months in 250 liter Islay Scotch hogsheads, Islay Scotch Cask Finish is bottled at 95 proof.

In the late spring of 2022, Chattanooga Whiskey released a new expression of their Bottled in Bond Bourbon whiskey crafted at their Chattanooga Whiskey Riverfront Distillery.

Distillery locations

Chattanooga Whiskey Experimental Distillery 
Located at the original site on Market Street, this location was first named Tennessee Stillhouse after the Chattanooga Whiskey parent company of the same name. The distillery opened in March, 2015, at which point all the blending and bottling for 1816 began. This location makes approximately one barrel of whiskey per week on a 100-gallon system with one cooker, three fermenters, and a Vendome hybrid pot/column still.

As the home of the Experimental Single Batch Series and the birthplace of "Tennessee High Malt", the distillery has released eight batches of experimental whiskey since August 2017, most highlighting a high malt style.

Chattanooga Whiskey Riverfront Headquarters 
Located on Riverfront Parkway, this location has become the headquarters and main production facility for the company. The distillery was opened to the public in December, 2017, for an open house event, but is currently only available for private events in the adjacent event hall. The system – made by Vendome – consists of four 2,700-gallon fermenters, a 2,700-gallon cooker, a beer well, a 12-inch, 30-foot continuous column still, and a custom 100-gallon doubler that can produce up to 14 barrels a day when running on a 24-hour shift. The barrelhouse has space for 4,500 53-gallon barrels and houses a large 4,000-gallon, charred white oak Solera tank for finishing. The facility also has a 4,000-square-foot event hall that is available for private events.

References

External links 
 

Distilleries in Tennessee
Distilleries in Indiana